Babloo Passah (born 20 December 1990) is an Indian cricketer. He made his List A debut for Meghalaya in the 2018–19 Vijay Hazare Trophy on 4 October 2018. He made his first-class debut for Meghalaya in the 2018–19 Ranji Trophy on 1 November 2018.

References

External links
 

1990 births
Living people
Indian cricketers
Meghalaya cricketers
Place of birth missing (living people)